New Amsterdam Football Club was an American professional soccer club based in Hempstead, New York. The club played in the National Independent Soccer Association, the third tier of American soccer. New Amsterdam FC was established on April 20, 2020, and began play in July 2020.

The club was founded by both Laurence Girard and Maximilian Mansfield, with Mansfield serving as sporting director.

History
In November 2019 it was revealed by some journalists that a possible New York-based group had applied for a team in the National Independent Soccer Association, a new third division soccer league. It was then further reported in January 2020 that the investor involved in the New York group was rumored to be Laurence Girard, the CEO of Fruit Street. The name "New Amsterdam FC" was also rumored to be in consideration.

A few months later, on April 20, it was officially announced that New Amsterdam FC would be the name for the New York based NISA side. The name is in reference to New Amsterdam, the 17th-century Dutch settlement that eventually formed New York City. At the time of the reveal, it was not announced when New Amsterdam FC would begin playing.

In May 2020, it was stated by New Amsterdam sporting director Maximilian Mansfield that the team would opt for a local approach, similar to Spanish club Athletic Bilbao, where 50 to 60 percent of the team will be local New Yorkers. On July 1, 2020 it was announced that New Amsterdam FC would be participating in the NISA Independent Cup, a tournament created by the league in the wake of the COVID-19 pandemic. A couple days later, on July 3, New Amsterdam FC announced their first signing, midfielder Martin Williams from Brooklyn.

On July 28, the team announced it would play its inaugural match against the New York Cosmos in the Independent Cup and the Fall 2020 season at the Hudson Sports Complex in Warwick, New York. It was later clarified that the venue choice was due to the COVID-19 pandemic in New York City and the team plans to move games back into the city proper once fans are able to attend.

Former US international and Major League Soccer player Eric Wynalda was announced as the first coach in team history on July 30. 18 days later, Wynalda stepped down for personal reasons.

The club won their first match in club history on June 16, 2021 over 1904 FC, snapping an eighteen match winless streak across all official competitions.

Club culture

Associated teams

The team also established reserve sides in both local and national amateur leagues. New Amsterdam FC II-SASC, formerly known as Sporting Astoria SC, plays in the NISA Nation, Eastern Premier Soccer League and Cosmopolitan Soccer League system. Bronx River Futbol Club, which began play in the United Premier Soccer League in 2020 as a partnership between Sporting Astoria and NAFC, will change its name to New Amsterdam FC III beginning in the Spring 2021 season.

Academy 

The team established an academy with U17 and U19 teams in January 2022.

Players and staff

Players

Coaching staff

Statistics and records

Season-by-season

References

External links
 New Amsterdam FC Official website

 
National Independent Soccer Association teams
Soccer clubs in the New York metropolitan area
Association football clubs established in 2020
2020 establishments in New York (state)